MASK (acronym of Muhammedum Albyum Shathrukkalaaya Katha) is a 2019 Indian Malayalam-language comedy film co-written and directed by Sunif Hanif. The film, produced by A. S. Gireesh Lal for Gowri Meenakshi Movies, stars Shine Tom Chacko, Chemban Vinod Jose , Vijayaraghavan and Priyanka Nair in the lead roles. Gopi Sundar composed the soundtrack and score, while Prakash Velayudhan handled the cinematography. The film, which tells the story of a police inspector who sets out to track down a thief, released on 5 June 2019. The film was a spiritual successor of the 2014 film Ithihasa starring Shine Tom Chacko and Anusree.

Cast

Shine Tom Chacko as Alby John, thief
Chemban Vinod Jose as S.I. Haneef Muhammed, a police officer
Priyanka Nair as Rasiya Begam, Haneef's wife
Vijayaraghavan as Ramji Rao
Salim Kumar as Cheguevara alias Jaggu Varapuzha
Roshna Ann Roy as Kunjumol
Sasi Kalinga
Abu Salim as Subair
 Ameer Niyas as Doctor
 Niyas Bakker 
Nirmal Palazhi as Abdu
 Manoj Guinness as Patru
 Chembil Asokan as Achayan
 Chali Pala
 Ponnamma babu as ammachi
 Pashanam Shaji as police constable 
 Mammukoya as Valiyauppa 
 Shaiju as Najim elder brother of rasiya
 Prasanth Alexander as elder brother of rasiya
 Krishna Praba as Najeeb's wife
 Juhi Rustagi
 Kottayam Pradeep
 Jayakrishnan

References

External links
 

2019 films
2019 comedy films
Indian comedy films
2010s Malayalam-language films
Films scored by Gopi Sundar